Burak Hascan (born June 1, 1978 in İstanbul) is a Turkish volleyball player. He is 200 cm and plays as middle player. He has been playing for the Fenerbahçe Men's Volleyball Team since 2003 and wears number 10.  He is the team's captain and has played over 100 times for the national team. He had also played for Netas.

External links
 Player profile at fenerbahce.org

1978 births
Living people
Volleyball players from Istanbul
Turkish men's volleyball players
Fenerbahçe volleyballers
Eczacıbaşı volleyball players